Kabouter is the Dutch word for gnome or leprechaun. In folklore, the Dutch Kabouters are akin to the Irish Leprechaun, Scandinavian Tomte or Nisse, the English Hob, the Scottish Brownie and the German Klabauter or kobold. 

In the folklore of the Low Countries, kabouters are tiny people who live underground, in a hill for instance. (In modern children's stories they live in mushrooms.) They are also spirits who help in the home. The males have long, full beards and wear tall, pointed red hats. They are generally shy of humans and in stories often punish people for spying on them. Throughout Flanders and the Netherlands they exist under a number of different local names like alvermannekes or auwelkes.
In the Legend of the Wooden Shoes, an old Dutch folktale, a kabouter teaches a Dutch man how to make piles and how to make wooden shoes.

The Dutch illustrator Rien Poortvliet played an important part in modern Kabouter lore with his publication of Leven en werken van de Kabouter (English title "Life and works of the Gnome"), later translated into English and published as "Gnomes". 

In popular culture today, the business Travelocity uses a Rien Poortvliet-style statue of a Kabouter for commercials. They call him the Travelocity Roaming Gnome.

The term kabouter was also adopted by a 1970s hippie movement in Amsterdam that sprang from the Provo movement (see Kabouters). One of its best known representatives is Roel van Duijn.

See also 
 Dick Laan
 Gnome King Kyrië
 Kabouter Plop
 Kabouter Wesley
 Paulus the woodgnome

Notes

Dutch legendary creatures
Dutch words and phrases
Gnomes